Antaeus was an American literary quarterly founded by Daniel Halpern and Paul Bowles and edited by Daniel Halpern. The magazine existed between 1970 and 1994.

Overview
It was founded and published in Tangier, Morocco, but operations were shifted to New York City in the mid-1980s. The first number appeared in the summer of 1970, the final issue (#75/76) in 1994. Beginning with the third issue, the magazine bore the imprint of the Ecco Press, which eventually became established as a book publisher. A small number of limited editions were also issued in conjunction with the magazine under the imprint of Antaeus Editions.

Particularly in its early years, Antaeus was known for its internationalist scope. Among its notable contributors were J. G. Ballard, Paul Bowles, Guy Davenport, Stephen King, Harry Mathews, Joyce Carol Oates, Breece D'J Pancake, Yannis Ritsos, W.H. Auden, Leslie Marmon Silko and Andrew Vachss.

See also
List of literary magazines

References

External links
Antaeus magazine's "Neglected Books of the 20th Century" at The Neglected Books Page

Quarterly magazines published in the United States
Defunct literary magazines published in the United States
Magazines established in 1970
Magazines disestablished in 1994
Magazines published in New York City
Mass media in Tangier
1970 establishments in Africa
1994 disestablishments in New York (state)